The earth pyramids of Ritten (German: Erdpyramiden am Ritten) are a natural monument that is located on the Ritten, a plateau not far from Bolzano in northern Italy. Earth pyramids are a fairly widespread phenomenon that exist in various locations, such as South Tyrol and Platten.

The original name in this area for these earth pyramids is Lahntürme, i.e., landslide towers. They originate from glacial moraine rocks. The columns of the pyramids may be more or less elongated, and the higher they are, the thinner they get, ending usually with a stone cover. These earth pyramids are constantly evolving, continuously eroding, and will possibly collapse and make way for new formations.

References

Further reading

 Fritz Dörrenhaus, Hans Becker: Der Ritten und seine Erdpyramiden. Vergleichende Betrachtung der Entstehung von Erdpyramiden in verschiedenen Klimagebieten der Erde (The Ritten and its earth pyramides. Comparative examination of the formation of earth pyramides in distinct climate regions of the earth), Kölner Geographische Arbeiten (Cologne Geographical Works), 17, Wiesbaden, Steiner, 1966.

Geography of South Tyrol
Erosion landforms